The beach stone-curlew (Esacus magnirostris) also known as beach thick-knee is a large, ground-dwelling bird that occurs in Australasia, the islands of South-east Asia.

It is less strictly nocturnal than most stone-curlews, and can sometimes be seen foraging by daylight, moving slowly and deliberately, with occasional short runs. It tends to be wary and fly off into the distance ahead of the observer, employing slow, rather stiff wingbeats. 
The beach stone-curlew is a resident of undisturbed open beaches, exposed reefs, mangroves, and tidal sand or mudflats over a large range, including coastal eastern Australia as far south as far eastern Victoria, the northern Australian coast and nearby islands, New Guinea, New Caledonia, Indonesia, Malaysia, and the Philippines. It is uncommon over most of its range, and rare south of Cairns.

A single egg is laid just above the high tide line on the open beach, where it is vulnerable to predation and human disturbance.

The beach stone-curlew is classified as Near Threatened on the IUCN Red List of Threatened Species.

Gallery

References

External links 
 BirdLife Species Factsheet

beach stone-curlew
Birds of Australia
Birds of Malesia
Birds of Melanesia
beach stone-curlew
beach stone-curlew]